Mrinal Saikia (born July 28, 1966 in Golaghat, Assam) is a Bharatiya Janata Party politician from Assam. He has been elected in Assam Legislative Assembly election in 2016 from Khumtai constituency.

Saikia was a former ULFA activist.

References 

1966 births
Living people
Bharatiya Janata Party politicians from Assam
Assam MLAs 2016–2021
People from Nagaon district
Assam MLAs 2021–2026